The Château de Villandry is a grand country house located in Villandry, in the département of Indre-et-Loire, France. It is especially known for its beautiful gardens.

History
The lands where an ancient fortress once stood were known as Columbine until the 17th century. They were acquired in the early 16th century by Jean Le Breton, France's Controller-General for War under King Francis I, and a new château was constructed around the original 14th-century keep where King Philip II of France once met Richard I of England to discuss peace.

The château remained in the Le Breton family for more than two centuries until it was acquired by the Marquis de Castellane. During the French Revolution the property was confiscated and in the early 19th century, Emperor Napoleon acquired it for his brother Jérôme Bonaparte.

In 1906, Joachim Carvallo purchased the property, financed by his wife Ann Coleman, who was an heiress to the Coleman fortune. Extensive time, money, and devotion were then poured into repairing it and creating extraordinary gardens. Its famous Renaissance gardens include a water garden, ornamental flower gardens, and vegetable gardens.  The gardens are laid out in formal patterns created with low box hedges. In 1934, Château de Villandry was designated a Monument historique. Like all the other châteaux of the Loire Valley, it is a World Heritage Site.

Recent times
Still owned by the Carvallo family, the Château de Villandry is open to the public and is one of the most visited châteaux in France; in 2007 the château received about 330,000 visitors.

References

External links 
 
 Castle of Villandry on Google Cultural Institute
 Château de Villandry - The official website of France (in English)
 Photos of Villandry

Châteaux in Indre-et-Loire
Châteaux with Renaissance gardens in France
Gardens in Indre-et-Loire
Monuments historiques of Indre-et-Loire
Historic house museums in Centre-Val de Loire
Museums in Indre-et-Loire